Jagriti Public school is located in New Delhi, Sangam Vihar, India. It is recognized by CBSE Delhi. It is part of the Maimpal Welfare Society, starting in 2002 as a primary school and now up to SENIOR SECONDARY LEVEL. In 2018 it was given recognition by CBSE Delhi for up to class 12th with Science Commerce and Arts stream.

Facilities
 Junior Computer Laboratory
 Senior Computer Laboratory
 First aid
 Music Room
 Science Laboratory
 Meditation
 Playground
welleducated teaching staff
enough fourth class staff

Activities
 Student Council
 Inter school competitions
 Yoga
 Western/classical dance
 Art and craft
many other carrier based competitions
Subjects
 Physics
 Chemistry
 Biology
 Mathematics
 Social Science
 Hindi
 English language
 Sanskrit

See also
Education in India
Education in Delhi
List of schools in Delhi
 CBSE

References

External links

Schools in Delhi